Masooma Hayat (born 15 March 1980) is a Pakistani politician who was a Member of the Provincial Assembly of Balochistan, from May 2013 to May 2018.

Early life and education

Hayat was born on 15 March 1980 in Quetta, Balochistan, Pakistan.

She has the degree of Master of Science and the degree of the Master of Education.

Political career

She was elected to the Provincial Assembly of Balochistan as a candidate of Pashtunkhwa Milli Awami Party on a reserved seat for women in 2013 Pakistani general election.

References

Living people
1980 births
Balochistan MPAs 2013–2018
Women members of the Provincial Assembly of Balochistan
21st-century Pakistani women politicians